Norbert Glante (born 8 August 1952, in Caputh) is a German politician who served as a Member of the European Parliament from 1994 until 2014. He is a member of the Social Democratic Party of Germany, part of the Socialist Group.
 
During his time in parliament, Glante sat on the European Parliament's Committee on the Environment, Public Health and Food Safety. He also served as a member for the Committee on Industry, Research and Energy, a member of the Delegation to the EU-Chile Joint Parliamentary Committee and a substitute for the Delegation for relations with Mercosur. He was the Parliament's rapporteur on the Galileo satellite navigation system and cogeneration.

Career
 1969-1972: Apprenticeship as electrical engineer, VEB Elektronische Bauelemente, Teltow
 1973-1976: Test bench mechanic, VEB Elektronische Bauelemente, Teltow
 1974-1976: Advanced school-leaving certificate, adult education institute
 1976-1980: Studied automation technology in Leipzig
 1980-1984: Design engineer, VEB Elektronische Bauelemente, Teltow
 1984-1990: Computer scientist, Central Institute for Geophysics, Potsdam
 1990-1994: Chairman of Potsdam district council
 1994-2014: Member of the European Parliament

Education
 Chairman of Brandenburg regional association of the Europa Union
 Member of the Europe House, Brandenburg
 Member of the German-Polish Society
 Member of the German War Graves Commission
 Member of the European Energy Foundation
 founder member of the European Internet Foundation
 2010: Member of the policy steering committee, Potsdam City of Culture

Decorations
 Bundesverdienstkreuz with ribbon

See also
 2004 European Parliament election in Germany

References

External links
 
 
 

1952 births
Living people
MEPs for Germany 2004–2009
Recipients of the Cross of the Order of Merit of the Federal Republic of Germany
Social Democratic Party of Germany MEPs
MEPs for Germany 1994–1999
MEPs for Germany 1999–2004
MEPs for Germany 2009–2014